Bubonoxena is a genus of moths belonging to the subfamily Olethreutinae of the family Tortricidae.

Species
Bubonoxena alatheta  Razowski & Trematerra, 2010 (Ethiopia)
Bubonoxena spirographa Diakonoff, 1968 (Philippines)

See also
List of Tortricidae genera

References
De Prins, J. & De Prins, W. 2016. Afromoths, online database of Afrotropical moth species (Lepidoptera). World Wide Web electronic publication (www.afromoths.net)  (acc.12-Mar-2017)
Diakonoff A. 1968c. Microlepidoptera of the Philippine Islands. - Bulletin of the United States National Museum 257 (1967):1–484.

Tortricidae genera
Olethreutinae
Taxa named by Alexey Diakonoff